Kazimierz "Casey" Frąckiewicz is a retired Polish association football player who played in the NASL between 1967 and 1974 for the St. Louis Stars and Boston Minutemen.

In addition to playing for the Stars, he coached the team from 1971 to 1973. In 1972 he won NASL Coach of the Year honors and lead St. Louis to the Southern Division title and into the championship final. Frankiewicz also scored the Stars' lone goal in their 2–1 loss to New York in the Finals. He was a first team NASL All-Star in 1968, a second team All-Star in 1971 and an Honorable Mention in 1972.

References

External links
NASL career stats
Profile at legia.net 

1939 births
Living people
Polish footballers
Polish expatriate footballers
Zawisza Bydgoszcz players
Lechia Gdańsk players
Legia Warsaw players
NAC Breda players
National Professional Soccer League (1967) players
North American Soccer League (1968–1984) coaches
North American Soccer League (1968–1984) players
Boston Minutemen players
St. Louis Stars (soccer) players
Expatriate soccer players in the United States
Expatriate soccer managers in the United States
Polish expatriate sportspeople in the United States
Expatriate footballers in the Netherlands
Polish expatriate sportspeople in the Netherlands
People from Pułtusk
Sportspeople from Masovian Voivodeship
People from Warsaw Voivodeship (1919–1939)
Association football forwards
Eredivisie players
Polish football managers